Stagno Lombardo is a comune (municipality) in the Province of Cremona in the Italian region Lombardy, located about  southeast of Milan and about  southeast of Cremona.

Stagno Lombardo borders the following municipalities: Bonemerse, Castelvetro Piacentino, Cremona, Gerre de' Caprioli, Pieve d'Olmi, Polesine Zibello, Villanova sull'Arda.

References

External links
 Official website

Cities and towns in Lombardy